Giacomo Gambetta Sponza (born 27 September 1998) is a Peruvian footballer who plays as a goalkeeper for Peruvian Primera División side Sport Boys.

Club career

Sport Boys
Gambetta is a product of Universidad San Martín and later joined Sport Boys.

He was promoted to the first team squad ahead of the 2018 season as the second choice behind Fernando Martinuzzi. He got his official debut in the last game of the 2018 Torneo Descentralizado season, 25 November 2018, against Unión Comercio, which ended with a 4–2 defeat. At the end of December 2018, he signed a new contract until the end of 2020. In the 2019 season, Gambetta was only on the bench for six league games and made zero appearances.

Personal life
Giacomo is the younger brother of Peruvian footballer Gianmarco Gambetta.

References

External links
 
 

Living people
1998 births
Association football goalkeepers
Peruvian footballers
Peruvian Primera División players
Club Deportivo Universidad de San Martín de Porres players
Sport Boys footballers